France was represented by Joël Prévost, with the song "Il y aura toujours des violons", at the 1978 Eurovision Song Contest, which took place on 22 April in Paris following Marie Myriam's victory for France the previous year.

Before Eurovision

National final 
Broadcaster TF1 again opted for a public selection, with two semi-finals followed by the final on 26 March 1976.

Semi-finals
Each semi-final contained seven songs, with the top three in each going forward to the final. The qualifiers were chosen by public televoting. One of the successful participants in the first semi-final was 1967 French representative Noëlle Cordier.

Final
The final took place on 26 March 1978, hosted by Evelyn Leclercq. The winner was chosen by public televoting. It was later rumoured that "Laisse pleurer les rivières" was the preferred option of TF1, who had given it the advantageous first performance slot, and were taken aback when it was decisively beaten into second place by a song which had not even won its semi-final.

At Eurovision
On the night of the final Prévost performed 6th in the running order, following Portugal and preceding Spain. "Il y aura toujours des violons" was a very traditional old-style Eurovision ballad with little relevance to contemporary music. However it had a memorable melody, and at the close of voting had picked up 119 points, placing France third of the 20 entries. It achieved the distinction of becoming only the second non-winning Eurovision song – following Catherine Ferry's "Un, deux, trois" in 1976, also for France – ever to receive votes from every other national jury, completing a hat-trick of consecutive contests in which every other national jury had voted for the French song, a record which still stands. The French jury awarded its 12 points to Belgium.

Voting

References 

1978
Countries in the Eurovision Song Contest 1978
Eurovision